Vladimir Mikhailovich Tatosov (10 May 1926 – 24 December 2021) was a Russian stage, television, voice and film actor. He had an honorary title  People's Artist of the RSFSR (1991).

Biography
Tatosov was born on 10 May 1926, in Moscow into an Armenian family. He spent his childhood in Baku.

In 1946, he graduated from the drama school at the Sverdlovsk Drama Theater. In 1947, he was admitted to the troupe of the Saint Petersburg Comedy Theatre, after a while he moved to the Lenin's Komsomol Theatre. In 1963 he became an artist of the Gorky Bolshoi Drama Theater. In 1971 he moved to the Lenfilm film studio.

He performed a lot in the variety, one year worked together with Arkady Raikin.

In 2005, Tatosov published his autobiographical book  And I Want to Fly.

A few days before his death, Tatosov was admitted to a hospital in Saint Petersburg with cancer. Soon he was transferred to another hospital, where he contracted COVID-19. Tatosov died from COVID-19 on 24 December 2021, at the age of 95.

Selected filmography

Actor

 A Big Family (1954) as photojournalist
 October Days (1958) as Abram Gots
 Road to the Stage (1963) as Khachyan, assistant director
 The Salvos of the Aurora Cruiser (1965) as Yakov Sverdlov
 Tatyana's Day (1967) as Yakov Sverdlov
 Intervention (1968) as  Imertsaki, card-sharper
 The Sixth of July (1968) as Yakov Sverdlov
 Mission in Kabul (1970) as Secretary of the Embassy of Afghanistan
 Hail, Mary! (1970) as  Ignacio Mures
 Grandmaster (1973) as  Sergey Aleksandrovich
 Failure of Engineer Garin (1973) as  Tyklinski
 Ksenia, Fedor's Beloved Wife (1974) as  Kondratyev
 The Straw Hat (1974) as  Felix, Fadinar's servant 
 Trust (1976) as  Yakov Sverdlov
 Love at First Sight (1977) as  Ashot
 Late Meeting (1979) as   Vasily Mikhailovich Belyakov, painter
 I Shall Never Forget (1983) as   Dr. Hakobyan
 The Twentieth Century Approaches (1986) as   Baron von Herling
 Gobseck (1986) as   Gobseck
 Bandit Petersburg (2001) as   Moisey Lazarevich Gutman
 Deadly Force (2003) as   grandfather Tarelka
 Streets of Broken Lights (2004) as   Pavel Borisov

Voice
 Solaris (1972) as Dr. Snaut (played by Jüri Järvet)
 Heavenly Swallows (1976) as director of the theater-variety show (played by Ilya Rakhlin)

References

External links
 

1926 births
2021 deaths
Male actors from Moscow
Soviet male voice actors
Soviet male television actors
Soviet male stage actors
Soviet male film actors
Russian male film actors
Russian male stage actors
Russian male television actors
Russian male voice actors
Honored Artists of the RSFSR
People's Artists of the RSFSR
Russian people of Armenian descent
Deaths from the COVID-19 pandemic in Russia